Double Trios is a 1986 album by jazz pianist McCoy Tyner released on the Denon label. It features performances by Tyner supported by bassist Avery Sharpe and drummer  Louis Hayes or bass guitarist Marcus Miller and drummer Jeff "Tain" Watts along with percussionist Steve Thornton. The Allmusic review by Scott Yanow states "it is particularly interesting to hear the pianist's reworkings of "Lil' Darlin'," "Satin Doll", "Lover Man" and Thelonious Monk's "Rhythm-A-Ning," transforming them into modal masterpieces".

Track listing
 "Latino Suite" - 8:45  
 "Lil' Darlin'" (Hefti) - 7:10  
 "Dreamer" - 7:41  
 "Satin Doll" (Ellington, Mercer, Strayhorn) - 7:10  
 "Down Home" - 8:44  
 "Sudan" (Miller)  8:52  
 "Lover Man" (Davis, Ramirez, Sherman) - 8:45  
 "Rhythm-A-Ning" (Monk) - 4:32  
All compositions by McCoy Tyner except as indicated
Recorded at Clinton Studio, New York, NY, June 7 (tracks 1-4) & 9 (tracks 5-8), 1986

Personnel
McCoy Tyner: piano
Avery Sharpe: bass (tracks 1-4)
Louis Hayes: drums (tracks 1-4)
Marcus Miller: electric bass (tracks 5-8)
Jeff "Tain" Watts: drums (tracks 5-8)
Steve Thornton: percussion (tracks 1, 3, 5-7)

References

McCoy Tyner albums
1986 albums
Denon Records albums